Evelyn Carrera Pichardo (born October 5, 1971 in Santo Domingo) is a retired female volleyball player from the Dominican Republic, who competed at the 2004 Summer Olympics in Athens, Greece, wearing the number #5 jersey. There she ended up in eleventh place with the Dominican Republic women's national team. Carrera played as a libero.

Career
Evelyn win the silver medal at the 2002 Pan-American Cup held in Mexicali, Mexico; she also was awarded Best Libero for the tournament.

She won the gold medal and the Best Libero award with the national squad at the 2003 Pan American Games.

Carrera was named Best Digger and Best Libero at the 2004 Pan-American Cup.

Playing professionally in the Puerto Rico's Liga de Voleibol Superior Femenino, she was awarded as the Best Libero, and among the All Star Team 2006.

Beach Volleyball
During the Holy Week Sport Festival held in Hato Mayor, Carrera played Beach Volleyball (three) with Yenifer Calcaño and Brenda Castillo, winning the Gold Medal of the event.

Clubs
  Los Trinitarios (1996)
  Chicas de San Juan (1997)
  Rio Marsì Pa (2000–2001)
  Chicas de San Juan (2002)
  Modeca (2005)
  Leonas de Ponce (2004–2006)
  Vaqueras de Bayamón (2007)
  Espaillat (2008)
  La Romana (2008)
  Indias de Mayagüez (2009)

Awards

Individuals
 2000–2001 Italian League All-Star
 2002 Pan-American Cup "Best Libero"
 2003 Pan-American Cup "Best Libero"
 2003 Pan-American Games "Best Libero"
 2004 Pan-American Cup "Best Digger"
 2004 Pan-American Cup "Best Libero"
 2005 Puerto Rican League, "Libero of the Year"
 2006 Puerto Rican League, "All-Star"
 2006 Puerto Rican League, "Libero of the Year"
 2006 Puerto Rican League, "Defense Leader"

Beach Volleyball
 2009 Hato Mayor Beach Volleyball Tournament  Gold Medal

References

External links
 FIVB biography

1971 births
Living people
Dominican Republic women's volleyball players
Volleyball players at the 2004 Summer Olympics
Olympic volleyball players of the Dominican Republic
Volleyball players at the 2003 Pan American Games
Pan American Games gold medalists for the Dominican Republic
Dominican Republic people of Basque descent
Pan American Games medalists in volleyball
Central American and Caribbean Games gold medalists for the Dominican Republic
Central American and Caribbean Games silver medalists for the Dominican Republic
Competitors at the 1998 Central American and Caribbean Games
Competitors at the 2002 Central American and Caribbean Games
Competitors at the 2006 Central American and Caribbean Games
Expatriate volleyball players in Italy
Expatriate volleyball players in the United States
Dominican Republic expatriates in Italy
Dominican Republic expatriates in the United States
Central American and Caribbean Games medalists in volleyball
Medalists at the 2003 Pan American Games